Mayfield is a civil parish in the district of East Staffordshire, Staffordshire, England.  It contains 39 listed buildings that are recorded in the National Heritage List for England.  Of these, one is listed at Grade I, the highest of the three grades, two are at Grade II*, the middle grade, and the others are at Grade II, the lowest grade.  The parish includes the village of Mayfield and smaller settlements, including Upper Mayfield, Middle Mayfield, and Church Mayfield, and is otherwise rural.  Most of the listed buildings are houses and associated structures, cottages, farmhouses and farm buildings.  The other listed buildings include a church, items in the churchyard, a chapel, and two mileposts.


Key

Buildings

References

Citations

Sources

Lists of listed buildings in Staffordshire